Gezov is a rural locality (a khutor) in Alexeyevsky District, Belgorod Oblast, Russia. The population was 305 as of 2010. There are 4 streets.

Geography 
Gezov is located 12 km southwest of Alexeyevka (the district's administrative centre) by road. Shcherbakovo is the nearest rural locality.

References 

Rural localities in Alexeyevsky District, Belgorod Oblast
Biryuchensky Uyezd